The Netherlands Institute for Innovative Ocular Surgery (NIOS) is an institute providing products for extraocular implants and extraocular cosmetic surgery.

External links
Netherlands Institute for Innovative Ocular Surgery

Scientific institutes in the Netherlands
Science and technology in the Netherlands